B. D. Devassy is a Communist Party of India (Marxist) politician from Thrissur and Member of the Kerala Legislative Assembly from Chalakudy Assembly Constituency.

References

Communist Party of India (Marxist) politicians from Kerala
Malayali politicians
Politicians from Thrissur
Living people
Kerala MLAs 2016–2021
Kerala MLAs 2011–2016
People from Chalakudy
Year of birth missing (living people)